42 class may refer to:

British Rail Class 42
DRG Class 42
New South Wales 42 class locomotive